The 2020–21 FC Akhmat Grozny season was the 12th successive season that the club played in the Russian Premier League, the highest tier of association football in Russia. Akhmat Grozny finished the season in 11th position and where knocked out of the Russian Cup by Krylia Sovetov in the Semifinals.

Season events
On 26 July, Akhmat Grozny announced Andrei Talalayev as their new manager, after Igor Shalimov's contract wasn't renewed after it expired at the end of the previous season.

On 1 August, Akhmat Grozny announced the signing of Giorgi Shelia, on a two-year contract, with the option of a third, from Tambov.

On 5 August, Magomed Mitrishev moved to Chayka Peschanokopskoye on loan for the season.

On 6 August, Akhmat re-signed Oleg Ivanov to a one-year contract after his previous deal expired at the end of the previous season, and announced the signing of Aleksandr Putsko, to a two-year contract from Ufa, and the season-long loan deal signing of Artyom Timofeyev from Spartak Moscow.

On 12 August, Ravanelli joined Athletico Paranaense on loan until February 2021.

On 14 August, Georgi Melkadze joined Akhmat on a season-long loan deal from Spartak Moscow.

On 16 August, Akhmat announced the signing of Marat Bystrov from Ordabasy.

On 24 August, Konrad Michalak joined Çaykur Rizespor on loan for the season.

On 1 October, Akhmat announced the signing of Amir Adouyev from Montpellier to a long-term contract and Artem Polyarus from Khimki on a three-year contract.

On 12 October, Idris Umayev moved on loan to Chayka Peschanokopskoye for the season.

On 15 October, Rotor Volgograd signed Andrés Ponce on loan from Akhmat Grozny for the remainder of the season.

At the start of the winter break, Akhmat Grozny announced that they would hold eight friendly matches during their Winter Training Camp in Turkey.

On 10 January, Oleg Ivanov left Akhmat Grozny after his contract was terminated by mutual agreement.

On 13 January, Akhmat announced the signing of Gabriel Iancu from Viitorul Constanța on a 3.5-year deal.

On 20 January, Akhmat announced the signing of Ladislav Almási on loan from MFK Ružomberok for the remainder of the season.

On 15 February, Odise Roshi joined Diósgyőri on loan for the remainder of the season.

On 25 March, Ravanelli was loaned to Chapecoense until the end of the season.

On 29 March, Ablaye Mbengue joined Dinamo Minsk on loan until the end of the 2021 season.

Squad

On loan

Left club during season

Transfers

In

Loans in

Out

Loans out

Released

Friendlies

Competitions

Overview

Premier League

Results summary

Results by round

Results

League table

Russian Cup

Round of 32

Knockout stage

Squad statistics

Appearances and goals

|-
|colspan="14"|Players away from the club on loan:

|-
|colspan="14"|Players who appeared for Akhmat Grozny but left during the season:

|}

Goal scorers

Clean sheets

Disciplinary record

References

FC Akhmat Grozny seasons
Akhmat Grozny